The Visoki Dečani Monastery is a medieval Serbian Orthodox Christian monastery located near Deçan, Kosovo. It was founded in the first half of the 14th century by Stefan Dečanski, King of Serbia.

The Visoki Dečani monastery is located by the Deçan's Lumbardh river gorge at the foot of the Accursed Mountains, in the region of Metohija. The monastery is managed by the Serbian Orthodox Eparchy of Raška and Prizren. The monastery has been under the legal protection of Serbia since 1947 with a designation of Cultural Monument of Exceptional Importance. The monastery is part of the World Heritage site named "Medieval Monuments in Kosovo".

History

The construction of the monastery began during the reign of the Serbian King Stefan Dečanski, in 1327. The original founding charter from 1330, also known as the Dečani chrysobull, has been preserved to this day. After his death in 1331, Stefan Dečanski was buried in the still unfinished monastery, the construction of which was continued by his son Stefan Dušan, who became the King of Serbia in the same year. The main architect of the monastery was the Franciscan friar Vito of Kotor. According to Branislav Pantelić, the monastery represents the last phase of the Western, Gothic, Byzantine-Romanuesque architecture and contains Byzantine paintings and numerous Romanseque sculptures, part of a "Palaeologan renaissance".

The construction of the monastery lasted for a total of 8 years and ended in 1335. The wooden throne of the hegumen (monastery head) was finished at around this time, and the church interior was decorated. Dečanski's carved wooden sarcophagus was finished in 1340. Those who contributed to the construction of the monastery were collectively gifted a village close to the city of Prizren named Manastirica, where many settled following completion. Serbian princess and Bulgarian empress consort Ana-Neda (d. ca. 1350) was buried in the church.

During the Middle Ages, entire Albanian villages were gifted by Serbian kings, particularly Stefan Dušan, as presents to the Serbian monastery of Deçan, as well as those of Prizren and Tetova.

15th–19th century

Bulgarian writer Gregory Tsamblak, author of the Life of Stefan Dečanski, was the hegumen (monastery head) at the beginning of the 15th century. The painter-monk Longin spent two decades in the monastery during the second half of the 16th century and created 15 icons with depictions of the Great Feasts and hermits, as well as his most celebrated work, the icon of Stefan Dečanski. In the late 17th century, the Ottomans plundered the monastery, but inflicted no serious damage. In 1819, archimandrite Zaharija Dečanac became Metropolitan of Raška and Prizren.

20th and 21st century
Following the end of the First Balkan War, the monastery fell within the administration of the Kingdom of Montenegro. The then King Nikola I of Montenegro placed much of the surrounding land under the monastery's jurisdiction. During World War I, the monastery's treasures were plundered by the Austro-Hungarian Army, which occupied Serbia between 1915 and 1918. The monastery fell within the territory of the Italian-ruled Albanian Kingdom during World War II, and was targeted for destruction by the Albanian nationalist Balli Kombëtar and Italian fascist blackshirts in mid-1941. The Royal Italian Army responded by sending a group of soldiers to help protect the monastery from attack. 
 
The monastic treasure was exhibited in the rebuilt medieval refectory in 1987. The monastery's monks sheltered refugees of all ethnicities during the Kosovo War, which lasted from March 1998 to June 1999. On 7 May 1998, the corpses of two elderly Albanians were found  from the monastery. They were reportedly killed by the Kosovo Liberation Army (KLA) for allegedly collaborating with Serbian forces. The KLA staged an attack not far from the monastery on 8 May, killing one person and wounding four others. That evening,  Deçan's 300 remaining Serbs came to the monastery to seek shelter.

Albanian civilians seeking refuge in the monastery returned to their homes following the withdrawal of Serbian military from Kosovo in June 1999. An Italian unit of the Kosovo Force (KFOR) was subsequently assigned to guard the monastery, which was attacked on several occasions. Dozens of Romanis sought sanctuary in the monastery over the next several months, fearing retaliatory attacks by their Albanian neighbours, who accused them of collaborating with the Serbs and looting Albanian homes.

During the violent unrest in Kosovo on 17 March 2004, KFOR defended the monastery from an Albanian mob trying to throw Molotov cocktails at it. Several Albanians were shot and wounded in the clash. On 2 July 2004, the monastery was declared a World Heritage Site by the United Nations Educational, Scientific and Cultural Organization (UNESCO). UNESCO cited it as "an irreplaceable treasure, a place where traditions of Romanesque architecture meet artistic patterns of the Byzantine world." The monastery, along with all other Serbian Medieval Monuments in Kosovo, was added to the UNESCO list of endangered World Heritage sites in 2006.

Suspected Kosovo Albanian insurgents hurled hand grenades at the monastery on 30 March 2007, but caused little damage. In recent years, the situation around the monastery has stabilized and it has reopened to visitors. Serbian President Boris Tadić attended a service at the monastery in April 2009. U.S. Vice President Joe Biden visited the monastery the following month. In the annual International Religious Freedom Report, the State Department wrote that the Deçan municipal officials continued to refuse to implement a 2016 Constitutional Court decision upholding the Supreme Court’s 2012 ruling recognizing the monastery’s ownership of approximately 24 hectares of land.

Architecture

The church has five-nave naos, a three-part iconostasis, and a three-nave parvise. With the dome, it is 26 m high. Its outer walls are done in alternate layers of white and pink marble. The portals, windows, consoles, and capitals are richly decorated. Christ the Judge is shown surrounded by angels in the western part of the church.  Its twenty major cycles of fresco murals represent the largest preserved gallery of Serbian medieval art, featuring over 1000 compositions and several thousand portraits.

Heritage site in danger

Dečani Monastery is one of four World Heritage medieval monuments in Kosovo designated as a heritage site in danger. Since the arrival of KFOR peacekeepers in the region in 1999, attacks on the Monastery have increased. Since 1999 there have been five significant attacks and near miss attacks on the monastery:

27 February 2000 – Six grenades hit the Decani Monastery.
22 June 2000 – Nine grenades hit the Decani Monastery.
17 March 2004 – Seven grenades fell around the monastery walls. This attack formed part of the 2004 unrest in Kosovo.
30 March 2007 – One grenade hit the wall behind the church.
1 February 2016 – Four armed suspects in a motor vehicle were detained at the gates of the monastery. A search of their car found an assault rifle, pistol, ammunition and extremist Islamist printed material. It is unclear whether there is any connection between the case of Decani and an earlier attack in a mosque in Drenas. Dusan Kozarev, member of government of Serbia had claimed a year earlier that the monastery gates were painted with graffiti that read "ISIS", "Caliphate is coming" and "UCK".

Dečani Monastery is currently under 24/7 guard from KFOR. Of the four medieval monuments in Kosovo that are designated as a heritage site in danger, Dečani is the only one under direct guard from KFOR.

In 2021, Europa Nostra has listed Visoki Dečani as one of the seven most endangered cultural heritage sites in Europe.

In popular culture 
Visoki Dečani, three episodes of the documentary series "Witnesses of Times" produced by the broadcasting service RTB in 1989 was created by PhD Gordana Babic and Petar Savković, directed by Dragoslav Bokan, music was composed by Zoran Hristić.

Other burials
Ana-Neda

See also
 :Category:Burials at Visoki Dečani
 Kosovo: A Moment in Civilization
Tourism in Serbia
Tourism in Kosovo
List of Serbian Orthodox monasteries
Architecture of Serbia

Annotations

References

Sources

Further reading

Antić, Ivana. Das Kloster Visoki Dečani. Manastir Visoki Dečani, 2008.
Burke, Kathleen. "VISOKI DECANI MONASTERY, KOSOVO A Medieval Refuge." SMITHSONIAN 39.12 (2009): 46–47.

 
 
 

 
KESIC-RISTIC, Sanja, and Dragan VOJVODIC. "Zidno slikarstvo manastira Decana: grada i studije; La peinture murale du monastère de Decani: matériaux et études; Beograd; Srpska akademija nauka i umjetnosti Menolog." (1995).
 
 
 
 
 
Ristanović, Petar R. "Guestbook of monastery Visoki Decani: 1924–1945: As historical source." Baština 39 (2015): 171–188.

External links

Dečani Monastery- Virtual Tours and Photo Collections of the BLAGO Fund
Evaluation by the World Heritage Committee

Cultural Monuments of Exceptional Importance (Serbia)
Deçan
Medieval Serbian sites in Kosovo
Buildings and structures completed in 1327
14th-century Serbian Orthodox church buildings
Gothic architecture in Serbia
Serbian Orthodox monasteries in Kosovo
Monuments and memorials in Kosovo
UFO sightings
Burial sites of the Nemanjić dynasty
Burial sites of the House of Shishman
Nemanjić dynasty endowments
Cultural heritage of Kosovo
World Heritage Sites in Serbia
Patriarchate of Peć